Puntius takhoaensis is a species of ray-finned fish in the genus Puntius. It is found in Vietnam.

References 

takhoaensis
Fish described in 1969
Fish of Vietnam